is a former professional tennis player from Japan.

Biography
Kuki, a right-hander, played collegiate tennis in the United States for UCLA. He had an unbeaten season in 1969, with a 13–0 record.

He was first picked for the Japan Davis Cup team in the 1971 tournament.

His best performance in a Grand Slam tournament came at the 1971 French Open when he had wins over Phil Dent and Petre Mărmureanu, before losing a five-set third round match to Bob Lutz.

In April 1976 he had the most prolific period of his career when he finished runner-up in a further two Grand Prix tournaments, both in Spain. He lost to Paolo Bertolucci in the final at Barcelona, then to Buster Mottram in Palma, Majorca.

A regular Davis Cup competitor for Japan in the 1970s, Kuki played the last of his nine ties for the Japanese team in 1978. He played a total of 17 singles matches, of which he won 11.

In the 1980s he was coach of Etsuko Inoue, a player on the women's circuit.

Grand Prix career finals

Singles: 2 (0–2)

See also
 List of Japan Davis Cup team representatives

References

External links
 
 
 

1945 births
Living people
Japanese male tennis players
UCLA Bruins men's tennis players
People from Yokkaichi
20th-century Japanese people